The George W. Childs School is an historic school building which is located in the Point Breeze neighborhood of Philadelphia, Pennsylvania.

It was added to the National Register of Historic Places in 1988.

History and architectural features
Built between 1893 and 1894, the George W. Childs School is a three-story, three-bay, brick building with brownstone trim, which was designed in the Classical Revival-style. 

A three-story, nine-bay yellow brick addition was subsequently erected in 1928, which features a stone arched entrance, Palladian window, and copper cornice.

It was added to the National Register of Historic Places in 1988. 

In 2010, the school building was closed, and the school and students were moved several blocks north to the former Barratt Junior High School building.

References

External links

School buildings on the National Register of Historic Places in Philadelphia
Neoclassical architecture in Pennsylvania
School buildings completed in 1894
South Philadelphia
Defunct schools in Pennsylvania